Maore Comorian, or Shimaore (French Mahorais), is one of the two indigenous languages spoken in the French-ruled Comorian islands of Mayotte; Shimaore being a dialect of the Comorian language, while ShiBushi is an unrelated Malayo-Polynesian language originally from Madagascar.  Historically, Shimaore- and ShiBushi-speaking villages on Mayotte have been clearly identified, but Shimaore tends to be the de facto indigenous lingua franca in everyday life, because of the larger Shimaore-speaking population.  Only Shimaore is represented on the local television news program by Mayotte La Première.  The 2002 census references 80,140 speakers of Shimaore in Mayotte itself, to which one would have to add people living outside the island, mostly in metropolitan France.  There are also 20,000 speakers of Comorian in Madagascar, of which 3,000 are Shimaore speakers.

The same 2002 census indicates that 37,840 persons responded as knowing how to read or write Shimaore.  However this number has to be taken with caution, since it was a few years after this census was taken that a standard writing system was introduced.

From a sociolinguistic perspective, French tends to be regarded by many Shimaore speakers as the language of higher education and prestige, and there is a temptation by native Mahorans to provide an all-French education to their children.  This puts a lot of pressure on Shimaore and the language may become endangered in the near future if nothing is done.

Although French remains the official language in Mayotte, Shimaore will probably be taught in Mahoran schools starting in the next few years, and a pilot project began in fall 2004.  As in many parts of France where local languages are introduced in the school system, this has led to tensions between partisans of a French-centered education system and administrations, versus those promoting a more diversified approach.  Shimaore's position in this regard is however different from other French regions (such as Brittany), since the language is locally spoken by a majority of the population.  The project in Mayotte has been inspired by similar projects involving Swahili in eastern Africa countries.

Mayotte is a geographically small territory, but frequent exchanges between villages only began in the last quarter of the twentieth century.  As of 2004, linguistic differences between the east and west part of the island, and between the main city of Mamoudzou and the remote villages, are still noticeable, especially when it comes to phonological differences.  One typical example is the word u-la (to eat), notably pronounced this way in the city due to the influence of a brand of yogurt bearing the same name, but pronounced u-dja in other parts of the island.

Orthography and phonology
Shimaore was traditionally written with an informal French-based Latin alphabet.  On , the Conseil de la Culture, de l'Éducation et de l'Environnement de Mayotte introduced an official alphabet developed by Association ShiMé that utilizes the basic Latin alphabet without c, q, and x and adds three letters: ɓ, ɗ, and v̄. On , the Conseil départemental de Mayotte announced the adoption of official orthographies in both Latin and Arabic scripts for Shimaore.

Phonology

Consonants

Vowels

This is a basic five-vowel system similar to that of languages such as Spanish.

Grammar

Noun classes

See also
Abdou Baco

Notes

See also
Mayotte: Languages

Bibliography
 Blanchy, Sophie (1987). L'interprète. Dictionnaire Mahorais - Français et Français - Mahorais. CMAC, Mayotte. L'Harmattan, Paris.
 Cornice, Abdillahi D. (1999). Manuel grammatical de shimaore. Mamoudzou, Mayotte: L'Association SHIME - Le SHImaorais MEthodique.
 Johansen Alnet, Aimee (2009). The clause structure of the Shimaore dialect of Comorian (Bantu). Ph.D thesis. University of Illinois at Urbana-Champaign, Urbana, Illinois.
 Kordji, Chamsidine, Martine Jaquin, et alia (1999). Narifundrihe shimaore - Apprenons le shimaore. Association SHIME, Mamoudzou.
 Maandhui, Ousseni (1996). Parlons Shimaore. Editions du Baobab, Mamoudzou.
 Rombi, Marie-Françoise (1983). Le Shimaore (Île de Mayotte, Comores): Première approche d'un parler de la langue comorienne. Paris: Société d'Etudes Linguistiques et Anthropologiques de France (SELAF).

External links
Ylangue
SHIME
Johansen Alnet's Thesis

Languages of the Comoros
Mahoran culture